Maecky Fred Ngombo Sansoni, known as Maecky Ngombo (born 31 March 1995) is a Belgian professional footballer who plays as a striker for Italian  club ACR Messina.

Club career

Roda JC
Ngombo joined Roda JC Kerkrade in 2015. He made his debut for Roda on 20 December 2015 against Willem II Tilburg. Overall, he scored 4 goals in 17 matches for the club.

Fortuna Düsseldorf
Ngombo moved to Fortuna Düsseldorf in 2016. On 31 August 2017, at the beginning of the 2017–18, season, Düsseldorf agreed to terminate his contract.

Loan to MK Dons
On 30 January 2017, Ngombo joined English League One side MK Dons on loan until the end of the 2016–17 season.

Return to Roda JC
In January 2018, Ngombo returned to former club Roda JC Kerkrade on a six-month contract having previously trialled with the club in October 2017.

Go Ahead Eagles
On 29 August 2019, he signed a contract with Dutch club Go Ahead Eagles for a term of one year with an additional one-year extension option.

Messina
On 2 December 2022, Ngombo signed with ACR Messina in the Italian third-tier Serie C.

International career
Born in Belgium and of Congolese descent. Ngombo is a Belgian youth international.

Career statistics

Honours

Club 

 CR Belouizdad

Algerian Ligue Professionnelle

 Algerian Super Cup (1): 2020

References

External links

Voetbal International profile 

1995 births
Living people
Belgian footballers
Belgium under-21 international footballers
Belgian expatriate footballers
Belgian people of Senegalese descent
Association football forwards
Roda JC Kerkrade players
Fortuna Düsseldorf players
Ascoli Calcio 1898 F.C. players
Milton Keynes Dons F.C. players
Go Ahead Eagles players
CR Belouizdad players
FC Botoșani players
KFC Houtvenne players
A.C.R. Messina players
Eredivisie players
2. Bundesliga players
Serie B players
Liga I players
Serie C players
Expatriate footballers in the Netherlands
Expatriate footballers in England
Expatriate footballers in Germany
Expatriate footballers in Italy
Expatriate footballers in Romania
Belgian expatriate sportspeople in the Netherlands
Belgian expatriate sportspeople in England
Belgian expatriate sportspeople in Germany
Belgian expatriate sportspeople in Italy
Belgian expatriate sportspeople in Romania
Black Belgian sportspeople